CBFC may refer to:
 Central Board of Film Censors, Pakistan
 Central Board of Film Certification, India
 Colwyn Bay F.C., Wales
 Craigmark Burntonians F.C., Scotland
 Cross-border fertility care or fertility tourism